Yax Patel (born 29 May 1999) is a Canadian cricketer. In October 2019, he was named in Canada's squad for the 2019–20 Regional Super50 tournament in the West Indies. He made his List A debut on 8 November 2019, for Canada against the Leeward Islands, in the Regional Super50 tournament.

References

External links
 

1999 births
Living people
Canadian cricketers
Place of birth missing (living people)